Xylosandrus discolor, is a species of weevil found in Australia, Micronesia, Myanmar, China, India, Sri Lanka, Indonesia, Malaysia, Taiwan and Thailand.

Description
Body length of the female ranges from 1.8 to 2.0 mm. Body bicolored. Pronotum light brown. Elytra dark brown. Antennae and legs are yellowish brown. Antennea with 5 funicular segments and obliquely truncate club. Pronotal vestiture of erect and hairy setae. Pronotal base covered with a dense patch of short erect setae. Pronotal disc is densely asperate-punctate. Pronotum consists with lateral costa and carina. Protibiae with 4 to 5 socketed teeth, whereas mesotibiae and metatibiae with 8 to 9 socketed teeth. In elytra, discal striae and interstriae multiseriate is punctate. Diclivital elytral face is steep and abruptly separated from disc. Elytral striae coarsely granulate with appressed hairy setae.

A polyphagous species, it is found in many plants. It is primarily a shoot borer.

Host plants
 Ailanthus altissima
 Albizia
 Allamanda cathartica
 Bauhinia variegata
 Camellia sinensis
 Cassia multijuga
 Castanopsis fargesii
 Cedrela toona
 Chloroxylon swietenia
 Coffea arabica
 Coffea robusta
 Hevea brasiliensis
 Juglans nigra
 Machilus indica
 Mangifera indica
 Persea americana
 Pterospermum acerifolium
 Rhus chinensis
 Sophora japonica
 Swietenia mahagoni
 Tephrosia candida
 Terminalia myriocarpa
 Terminalia procera
 Theobroma cacao
 Vitis vinifera

References 

Curculionidae
Insects of Sri Lanka
Beetles described in 1898